Harbor Moon is an original horror graphic novel created by Ryan Colucci in 2010. Written by Colucci and Dikran Ornekian, with a story by Brian Anderson and artwork by Polish artist Pawel Sambor.

The book debuted at San Diego Comic-con 2010 through Shuster award winning publisher Arcana Studio.

Harbor Moon tells the story of professional soldier Timothy Vance. When he receives information from someone claiming to be his long-lost father, he takes a trip to out-of-the-way Harbor Moon, Maine. It turns out that man hasn’t been there in thirty years and pretty soon Tim’s life is in danger. Fighting for the truth and his survival, Tim discovers that Harbor Moon is harboring a secret. The entire town is werewolves and the man he was looking for may be just like them. Just as a ruthless band of werewolf hunters descend upon the town, Tim must decide whether he is going to stay and fight or turn his back on what he really is.

References

 "Fangoria review of Harbor Moon"', "Fangoria", September 19, 2010.
 "Broken Frontier review of Harbor Moon"', "Broken Frontier", August 26, 2010.
 "Comic Bits Online review of Harbor Moon"', "Comic Bits Online", August 7, 2010.
 "From the Tomb review of Harbor Moon"', "From the Tomb", August 27, 2010.
 "Comic Monsters Interview with Ryan Colucci"', "Comic Monsters", July, 2010.
 "Berkeley Place review of Harbor Moon"',"Berkeley Place", October 29, 2010.
 "Alternative Magazine Online review of Harbor Moon"', "Alternative Magazine Online", September 27, 2010.
 "Signal-Watch review of Harbor"', "The Signal-Watch", October 25, 2010.
 "Werewolf-News review of Harbor Moon"', "Werewolf-News", October 29, 2010.
 "Invest Comics review of Harbor Moon"', "Invest Comics", October 19, 2010.
 "Pulp Metal Magazine review and interview"', "Pulp Metal Magazine", September 25, 2010.
 "69 Flavors of Paranoia review of Harbor Moon"', "69 Flavors of Paranoia"
 "Three Crow Press review of Harbor Moon"', "Three Crow Press", September 9, 2010.

External links
 Harbor Moon Official Site

Arcana Studio titles
2010 comics debuts